Stefan Vukčević (born 11 April 1997), is a Montenegrin professional footballer who plays as a midfielder for Gabala in the Azerbaijan Premier League.

Club career
On 14 August 2020, Vukčević signed 1+1 years contract with Gabala FK.

On 13 September 2020, Vukčević made his debut in the Azerbaijan Premier League for Gabala match against Sabah.

References

External links
 

1997 births
Living people
Footballers from Podgorica
Association football midfielders
Montenegrin footballers
Montenegro youth international footballers
Montenegro under-21 international footballers
FK Zeta players
Gabala FC players
Montenegrin First League players
Azerbaijan Premier League players
Montenegrin expatriate footballers
Expatriate footballers in Azerbaijan
Montenegrin expatriate sportspeople in Azerbaijan